The 1998 Gent–Wevelgem was the 60th edition of the Gent–Wevelgem cycle race and was held on 8 April 1998. The race started in Ghent and finished in Wevelgem. The race was won by Frank Vandenbroucke of the Mapei team.

General classification

References

Gent–Wevelgem
1998 in road cycling
1998 in Belgian sport
April 1998 sports events in Europe